Hooker Dam was a proposed dam on the Gila River in New Mexico, planned as a major component of the Central Arizona Project. Located near the mouth of the river's canyon upstream from the confluence of the Gila with Mogollon Creek and below Turkey Creek,  the dam was to be part of the CAP's Gila River Division, authorized under the 1968 Colorado River Basin Project Act. The project was planned to provide /year of water to western New Mexico.

Hooker Dam was to be located in Gila National Forest near the boundary of the Gila Wilderness. The proposed reservoir would have extended into the Gila Wilderness. Opposition to the dam came from The Wilderness Society and the Sierra Club, as well as from Arizona, which did not wish for New Mexico to retain the waters of the Gila. The enabling legislation included the phrase "Hooker Dam or a suitable alternative" to pacify conservationists who objected to the project.  Acting on a report from the Carter Administration, Congress deleted funding for Hooker Dam in 1978, but left the project authorization in place. A 1982 United States Bureau of Reclamation study indicated that Hooker Dam satisfied no existing need in New Mexico, with a significant environmental impact. As a result, the dam was removed from the CAP by Reclamation. Ground water was expected to satisfy local requirements through 2010, and the dam would impact critical habitat for two species of threatened fish, the spike dace and the loach minnow.

New Mexico is to present a plan to develop its rights by 2014; none of the options presently being considered involve a major dam. Water would be diverted from the Gila through perforated pipes in an infiltration gallery, or simply pumped from the river.

References

United States Bureau of Reclamation proposed dams
Buildings and structures in Grant County, New Mexico